The Egyptian Army uses a British Army Style ceremonial outfit, and a desert camouflage overall implemented in 2012. The Identification between different branches in the Egyptian Army depends on the branch insignia on the left upper arm and the color of the beret. Also, the airborne, Thunderbolt, and republican guard each has its own camouflage overall.

Ceremonial outfit

Everyday outfit

Field overall

Republican Guard

Camouflage Suit

Berets

Uniform accouterments

Badges and accouterments may be worn on service and ceremonial uniforms based on the following awards -

Master Freefall Parachutist
Airborne Paratrooper/Parachutist
Airmobile Soldier
Air Assault Soldier
Aviation Wings (Transport)
Aviation Wings (Helicopter)
Aviation Wings (Fighter-Bomber)
Aviation Wings (Qualified Paradropping)
Fighter Ace
Combat Helicopter Ace
Bomber & Close Air Support Ace
Artillery Aerial Observation Pilot
Forward Air Observer
Forward Ground Observer
Master Artillery Observation Officer
Master Tank Gunner
Master Tank Driver
Master Tank Commander
Excellent Tank Troop & Squadron Commander
Excellent Infantry & Special Forces Company Commander
Excellent in Combat Battalion Command
Master Sniper Class 1
Master Sniper Class 2
Expert Infantry Marksman Class 1
Expert Infantry Marksman Class 2
Anti-Tank Missile Master Gunner
Anti-Tank Missile Ace Gunner
Master Sapper Class 1
Master Sapper Class 2
Excellent Sapper Officer
Higher Formations' General Staff officer
Field Army General Staff Officer
Staff College Professor
Military Academies Professor
Completed Command & Staff Postgraduate Course

See also
Egyptian Army ranks
Comparative military ranks
Egyptian Air Force ranks
Egyptian Navy ranks
Egyptian Army

References

Egyptian military-related lists
Military equipment of Egypt
Military uniforms